Events from the year 1919 in Canada.

Incumbents

Crown 
 Monarch – George V

Federal government 
 Governor General – Victor Cavendish, 9th Duke of Devonshire 
 Prime Minister – Robert Borden
 Chief Justice – Louis Henry Davies (Prince Edward Island) 
 Parliament – 13th

Provincial governments

Lieutenant governors 
Lieutenant Governor of Alberta – Robert Brett 
Lieutenant Governor of British Columbia – Francis S. Barnard (until December 9) then Edward Gawler Prior 
Lieutenant Governor of Manitoba – James Albert Manning Aikins
Lieutenant Governor of New Brunswick – William Pugsley 
Lieutenant Governor of Nova Scotia – MacCallum Grant
Lieutenant Governor of Ontario – John Strathearn Hendrie (until November 20) then Lionel Herbert Clarke 
Lieutenant Governor of Prince Edward Island – Augustine Colin Macdonald (until July 16) then Murdock MacKinnon (from September 2)
Lieutenant Governor of Quebec – Charles Fitzpatrick 
Lieutenant Governor of Saskatchewan – Richard Stuart Lake

Premiers 
Premier of Alberta – Charles Stewart
Premier of British Columbia – John Oliver 
Premier of Manitoba – Tobias Norris 
Premier of New Brunswick – Walter Foster 
Premier of Nova Scotia – George Henry Murray 
Premier of Ontario – William Hearst (until November 14) then Ernest Drury
Premier of Prince Edward Island – Aubin Arsenault (until September 9) then John Howatt Bell 
Premier of Quebec – Lomer Gouin 
Premier of Saskatchewan – William Melville Martin

Territorial governments

Commissioners 
Gold Commissioner of Yukon – George P. MacKenzie 
Commissioner of Northwest Territories – William Wallace Cory

Events

January to June
January 19 – Canadian troops take part in the Battle of Shenkursk, part of the Russian Civil War.
February 17 – Wilfrid Laurier, leader of the Liberal Party of Canada and former prime minister of Canada, dies in office.
April 17 – New Brunswick women are permitted to vote.
April 10 – The Quebec referendum on the prohibition of alcohol.
May 3 – Yukon women are permitted to vote.
May 15 – June 25 – Winnipeg General Strike of 1919.
May 22 – The House of Commons passes the Nickle Resolution.
June – Rodeo's first reverse-opening side-delivery bronc chute is designed and made by rodeo cowboy Earl W. Bascom at the Bascom Ranch in Lethbridge, Alberta
June 6 – The government-owned Canadian National Railway is formed out of a number of financially troubled private railways.
June 28 – Canada signs the Treaty of Versailles, formally ending the First World War

July to December
September 1 – Prince Edward, Prince of Wales, opens the third session of the 13th Canadian Parliament
September 6 – George-Étienne Cartier Monument unveiled
September 9 – John Howatt Bell becomes premier of Prince Edward Island, replacing Aubin Arsenault.
October 20 – Ontario election: Ernest C. Drury's United Farmers of Ontario win a majority, defeating Sir William Hearst's Conservatives.
November 14 – Ernest Drury becomes premier of Ontario, replacing Sir William Hearst.

Full date unknown
Influenza epidemic in Alberta.
Monument aux braves de N.D.G. unveiled

Arts and literature
 February 27 – Robert Harris, Canadian painter (b. 1848)

Sport 
December 22 – Toronto Arenas become the Toronto St. Patricks
March 19–22 – Ontario Hockey Association's University of Toronto Schools win the first Memorial Cup by defeating the Saskatchewan Amateur Hockey Association's Regina Pats 29–8 in a two-game aggregate at the Arena Gardens in Toronto

Births

January to June

January 13 – Igor Gouzenko, Russian defector (d. 1982)
January 23 – Frances Bay, actress (d. 2011)
February 17 – J. M. S. Careless, historian (d. 2009)
February 20 
Thomas Ide, educator and the founding Chairman of TVOntario (d. 1996)
Joe Krol, Canadian football player (d. 2008)
March 21 – Victor Copps, politician and Mayor of Hamilton (d. 1988)
March 26 – Vernon Singer, politician (d. 2003)
April 16 – Louis Harrington Lewry, politician and reporter (d. 1992)
April 21 – William Perehudoff, painter (d. 2013)
May 27 – Francess Halpenny, editor and professor (d. 2017)
May 29 – Jacques Genest, physician and academic (d. 2018) 
June 19
Gérard Dionne, Roman Catholic bishop (d. 2020)
Simon Reisman, civil servant and chief negotiator of the Canada-United States Free Trade Agreement (d. 2008)
June 21 – Gérard Pelletier, journalist, editor, politician and Minister (d. 1997)

July to December
July 5 – Gordon Towers, politician and Lieutenant-Governor of Alberta (d. 1999)
August 1 – Jack Butterfield, President of the American Hockey League (1969–1994) (d. 2010)
August 9 – Edmund Hockridge, singer and actor (d. 2009)
August 19 – Margaret Marquis, Canadian-American actress (d. 1993)
August 21 – Marcel Lambert, politician and Speaker of the House of Commons of Canada (d. 2000)
September 1 – Gladys Davis, professional baseball player
September 11 – Daphne Odjig, artist (d. 2016)

October 12 – Gilles Beaudoin, politician and mayor of Trois-Rivières (d. 2007)
October 17 – Violet Milstead, World War II aviator and bush pilot (d. 2014) 
October 18 – Pierre Trudeau, politician and 15th Prime Minister of Canada (d. 2000)
November 1 – Russell Bannock, aviator and test pilot (d. 2020)
November 14 – Albert Ludwig, politician (d. 2019) 
December 10 – Vincent Brassard, politician (d. 1974)
December 25 – Paul David, cardiologist and founder of the Montreal Heart Institute (d. 1999)

Deaths

January 30 – Sam Steele, soldier and member of the North-West Mounted Police (b. 1849)
February 17 – Wilfrid Laurier, politician and 7th Prime Minister of Canada (b. 1841)
July 29 – Frederick Peters, lawyer, politician and Premier of Prince Edward Island (b. 1851)
August 18 – Joseph E. Seagram, distillery founder, politician, philanthropist and racehorse owner (b. 1841)
October 14 – Simon Hugh Holmes, publisher, lawyer, politician and Premier of Nova Scotia (b. 1831)
November 10 – Charles Mickle, politician (b. 1849)
November 11 – George Haddow, politician and merchant (b. 1833)
December 10 – Arthur Boyle, politician (b. 1842)
December 29 – William Osler, physician (b. 1849)

See also
 List of Canadian films

Historical documents
Canada and other dominions demand full status in League of Nations

J.W. Dafoe hears about Canadian researchers whose weapon helped to end First World War

Getting soldiers from France to England to Canada and their dispersal stations for discharge

Returning veteran longs for home, especially to escape English hostility and disdain

Soldiers' Civil Re-Establishment vocational officer reports 30% of trainees not prepared enough to get jobs, and 60% won't keep jobs

Film of highlights of tour by Edward, Prince of Wales to Prince Edward Island, Quebec and Ontario

Prince of Wales makes very successful postwar visit to Regina (Note: racial stereotypes)

Chronic illness resulting from influenza epidemic includes "Great White Plague" of tuberculosis

Debate on creation of federal health ministry brings up infant mortality, tuberculosis and venereal disease as well as influenza

Newspaper published "in the interest of the Citizens" opposes Winnipeg General Strike

Solicitor-General says legislation against sedition targets "insidious agencies of crime and revolt," not Winnipeg General Strike

Editorial insists Winnipeg General Strike leaders rightly charged with sedition, and trial will decide their guilt or innocence

Indictment for seditious libel against J.S. Woodsworth quotes his newspaper's coverage of police attack on Winnipeg General Strikers

Royal commission reports on causes and events of Winnipeg General Strike

Alberta labour leader reports on convention discussing discrimination at home and internationalism abroad

Communist Party of Canada program calls for rejection of reform in favour of revolution

Professor says chemistry graduates will keep leaving Canada until domestic chemical industry is induced to exploit their research talent

Stern warnings and instruction from Saskatoon Fire Department to combat "national disgrace of fire waste"

Boy Scouts provide courier service after Maritimes storm breaks telegraph connection between Western and Eastern Hemispheres

Opinion and possible legislation supports Canadian content in film-making

References

 
Years of the 20th century in Canada
Canada
Canada